The Wonderful World of the Pursuit of Happiness is the fifth and, to date, last studio album by Canadian power pop band The Pursuit of Happiness. It was their second album released under the now-defunct Canadian label Iron Music, was produced by the band's singer/guitarist/songwriter Moe Berg, and co-produced by the label's founder, Aubrey Winfield. The album was released in late 1996.

All of the tracks on the album are under four minutes in length, with the majority of them under three minutes, and there is no separation between tracks. As Berg explained, "The idea with this record was to format it so that a person could listen to the entire thing in one sitting, and since it's just over a half an hour it's definitely something people can get through without much effort."

Although the band has never officially broken up, after this release their new recordings have been restricted to individual songs for compilation albums, including "Edmonton Block Heater" on A Tribute to Hard Core Logo.

Track listing
All songs written by Moe Berg
"The Wonderful World" (0:30)
"Tara" (2:19)
"I Like You" (1:32)
"Carmalina" (2:52)
"Metaphor" (2:11)
"She's The Devil" (2:01)
"She Kiss Away" (3:28)
"I'm Just Happy To Be Here" (3:02)
"Tara's Theme" (3:52)
"What You Did To My Girl" (2:20)
"Let's Not Play" (3:30)
"Hate Engine" (2:22)
"Back Of My Mind" (3:23)
"The Truth" (2:29)
"I Like You" (single version, bonus/hidden track)

Personnel
 Moe Berg – vocals, guitar
 Kris Abbott – guitar, vocals
 Brad Barker – bass
 Dave Gilby – drums, percussion

Guest Musicians
 Jennifer Foster – vocals on "Tara," "Carmelina," and "Let's Not Play"
 Matt Horner – keyboards, synthesizers, accordion
 Sarah McElcheran - flugelhorn, recorder
 Melanie Doane - violin

References

1996 albums
The Pursuit of Happiness (band) albums